Daniel Turney Taylor (December 23, 1900 – October 11, 1972) was a Major League Baseball outfielder from 1926 to 1936. He played with the Washington Senators, Chicago Cubs and Brooklyn Dodgers.

In a nine-year career, Taylor hit .297 (650-for-2190) with 44 home runs, 305 RBI, 388 runs scored, an OBP of .374 and a slugging percentage of .446. He hit a career high .319 and scored 87 runs with 11 home runs with the Cubs and Dodgers in 1932. He had 59 RBI in 1935, also a career high. 

Taylor was a minor-league manager in 1941 and 1942. He managed the Lansing Senators for part of the 1941 season and the Harrisburg Senators in 1942.

He died October 11, 1972 at age 71 in Latrobe, Pennsylvania.

References

External links
 

1900 births
1972 deaths
Major League Baseball outfielders
Brooklyn Dodgers players
Washington Senators (1901–1960) players
Chicago Cubs players
Baseball players from Pennsylvania
Minor league baseball managers
Buffalo Bisons (minor league) players
Memphis Chickasaws players
Reading Keystones players
Indianapolis Indians players
Columbus Red Birds players
Minneapolis Millers (baseball) players
Syracuse Chiefs players
Lansing Senators players
Harrisburg Senators players
People from Westmoreland County, Pennsylvania